Lite AC is a 24-hour soft adult contemporary  music format produced by Westwood One. 

Vice President/Contemporary Formats Cheri Marquardt and Director of Operations Jonathan Steele will program the format. Core artists include Billy Joel, Celine Dion, Chicago, Elton John, Fleetwood Mac and Hall and Oates. Westwood One President of Programming Kirk Stirland said affiliates wanted a softer alternative to the more upbeat AC format, and that Lite AC would be positioned between Adult Standards and AC.

References

External links 

American radio networks
Radio stations established in 2016
Soft adult contemporary radio stations in the United States